Zahi El-Khoury (born 8 January 1969) is a Lebanese fencer. He competed in the individual foil and épée events at the 1988 and 1992 Summer Olympics.

References

External links
 

1969 births
Living people
Lebanese male épée fencers
Olympic fencers of Lebanon
Fencers at the 1988 Summer Olympics
Fencers at the 1992 Summer Olympics
Lebanese male foil fencers